James Joseph Connolly (January 4, 1900 – September 30, 1940) was an American track and field athlete. Connolly represented the United States at the 1920 and 1924 Summer Olympics, and was part of the bronze medal-winning American team in the 3000-meter team race at the 1924 Olympics in Paris.

References

Sources
 

1900 births
1940 deaths
Athletes (track and field) at the 1920 Summer Olympics
Athletes (track and field) at the 1924 Summer Olympics
Olympic bronze medalists for the United States in track and field
American male long-distance runners
American male middle-distance runners
Medalists at the 1924 Summer Olympics
20th-century American people